Bang Khla is a district (amphoe) of Chachoengsao province, central Thailand.

History
Its history dates back to the late Ayutthaya period. Shortly before Ayutthaya's second fall (1766), Bang Khla used to be a place where Phraya Tak (later King Taksin) troops passed and stay overnight.

In the era before the reign of King Rama III of the early Rattanakosin period, Bang Khla used to be the center of Chachoengsao, before the town retreated to the present place.

The name "Bang Khla" roughly translated "place of Khla", Khla is a  type of mangrove plant (Calathea) that abounds along the banks of the Bang Pakong River that flows in the past. In addition, according to Sujit Wongthes, an independent historian. Bang Khla used to be informally known as "Rong Khlao" (โรงเหล้า, "liquor factory") because it was home to several breweries.

Bang Khla district was officially established in 1901. The district office was in Wat Mai Bang Khla, and in 2019 in Ban Suan Subdistrict. Bang Khla is the name of the village Ban Bang Khla, which is on the khlong ('canal') Bang Khla. As the district office was not in the center of the district area, the government moved it to Tao Sura, five kilometres from the old site. Later they changed the name of the tambon to Bang Khla to match the district name.

Bang Khla is also known for mangos. It is also the origin of jasmine rice as well (from the change of administrative area, the origin of jasmine rice became the area in neighbouring Ban Pho district today).

Geography
Neighbouring districts are (from the east clockwise): Ratchasan, Plaeng Yao, Ban Pho, Mueang Chachoengsao, Khlong Khuean of Chachoengsao Province; and Ban Sang of Prachinburi province.

The important water resource is the Bang Pakong River.

Administration

Central administration 
Bang Khla is divided into nine subdistricts (tambons), which are further subdivided into 56 administrative villages (mubans).

Missing numbers are the tambons which now form the Khlong Khuean District.

Local administration 
There are two subdistrict municipalities (thesaban tambons) in the district:
 Bang Khla consisting of subdistrict Bang Khla.
 Pak Nam consisting of subdistrict Pak Nam.

There are seven subdistrict administrative organizations (SAO) in the district:
 Bang Suan consisting of subdistrict Bang Suan.
 Bang Krachet consisting of subdistrict Bang Krachet.
 Tha Thonglang consisting of subdistrict Tha Thonglang.
 Sao Cha-ngok consisting of subdistrict Sao Cha-ngok.
 Samet Nuea consisting of subdistrict Samet Nuea.
 Samet Tai consisting of subdistrict Samet Tai.
 Hua Sai consisting of subdistrict Hua Sai.

References

Sources
 Bang Khla district history (Thai)

Bang Khla